The Fitzpatrick House is a historic residence in Romeoville, Lockport Township, Illinois.

History
Patrick Fitzpatrick immigrated from Canada in 1833-1834 and was one of Lockport's first settlers. Fitzpatrick purchased the  lot shortly after he arrive and constructed a farm. Irish immigrants flocked to the region in the mid to late 1830s during the construction of the Illinois and Michigan Canal. Fitzpatrick, who spent his childhood in Ireland, became an important figure in the local Irish community, having already reached a level of economic success before construction of the canal started. The limestone house was constructed along the Chicago–Ottawa stagecoach road, which later became Illinois Route 53.

Fitzpatrick's heirs donated portions of the farmstead to the Roman Catholic Archdiocese of Chicago, which was used for Lewis University. The last descendant of the Fitzpatrick family died in 1950. The house was added to the National Register of Historic Places in 1984. The home was acquired by Lewis University in 2001 and is currently used as an alumni affairs office.

Architecture
The Fitzpatrick House is a T-shaped stone house with Greek Revival details. The gable ends have two bays and the long section has three bays. The interior has been completely remodeled and has no historic integrity. The south (long) section may have been built first. This side has the front door, centered in the middle bay facing west toward Illinois 53. Typical of Greek Revival houses, the Fitzpatrick House has flat stone lintels, symmetrical proportions, and a horizontal transom. The property also has a  barn.

References

Houses in Will County, Illinois
Romeoville, Illinois
Houses on the National Register of Historic Places in Illinois
National Register of Historic Places in Will County, Illinois
Houses completed in 1842